The Witness Vanishes is a 1939 American mystery film directed by Otis Garrett and starring Edmund Lowe, Wendy Barrie, and Bruce Lester.

Cast list

Production
In 1937, Universal Pictures made a deal with Crime Club, who were published of whodunnits. Over the next few years Universal released several mystery films in the series. The Witness Vanishes was the last film in the series.The film was inspired by James Ronald's magazine serial They Can't Hang Me! which was the films working title.

Release
The Witness Vanishes was released by Universal Pictures on September 22, 1939.

References

Footnotes

Sources

External links
 
 

1939 mystery films
American mystery drama films
American black-and-white films
Universal Pictures films
Films directed by Otis Garrett
1939 films
1930s English-language films
1930s American films
1930s mystery drama films